Kenny King (born April 23, 1981) is an American former gridiron football defensive tackle. He was drafted by the Arizona Cardinals in the fifth round of the 2003 NFL Draft. He played college football at Alabama.

King was also a member of the Baltimore Ravens and the Calgary Stampeders.

Early years
He played high school football at Daphne High School in Daphne, AL Class of 1999.

Currently, he is the head coach of Daphne High School Trojan football.  He accepted the position in April 2016.

External links
Calgary Stampeders bio

1981 births
Living people
People from Daphne, Alabama
American football defensive ends
American football defensive tackles
Alabama Crimson Tide football players
Arizona Cardinals players
Baltimore Ravens players
Calgary Stampeders players
Frankfurt Galaxy players